The 1910 Denver Pioneers football team was an American football team that represented the University of Denver as a member of the Rocky Mountain Conference (RMC) during the 1910 college football season. In their fifth and final season under head coach John P. Koehler, the Pioneers compiled a 4–3–1 record (2–2 against conference opponents), tied for third place in the RMC, and outscored opponents by a total of 72 to 65.

Schedule

References

Denver
Denver Pioneers football seasons
Denver Pioneers football